The Ukrainian National Federation of Canada (U.N.F., Ukrainian: Українське Національне Об'єднання, УНО or UNO, said "oo-no") is a pan-Canadian cultural and non-for-profit organization of Ukrainian Canadians  Its headquarters are located Toronto, Ontario, Canada.  The organization was created to help Ukrainian Canadians through the trials and tribulations afflicting the community in the aftermath of The Great Depression.

The UNF counts among its organizing principles the universal values of "fair-play and justice in their proper prospective" with respect to all aspects of the Ukrainian cause.

The Federation formed from a merger of three existing groups: the Ukrainian War Veterans’ Association of Canada, the Organization of Ukrainian Women of Canada and the Ukrainian National Youth Federation of Canada in 1932 with the first branches being inaugurated in Edmonton, Alberta and Saskatoon, Saskatchewan in 1932. 

Ukrainian Canadians throughout Canada soon embraced the role the UNF sought to play with respect to 7 founding principles which include:

 A belief in duty and responsibility
 A belief in Canada
 A belief in social progress through reforms.
 A belief in cultural traditions.
 A belief in the moral principles of Christianity.
 A belief in freedom of all peoples.
 A belief in a free Ukraine.

In August 2022, Russia designated the Ukrainian National Federation of Canada as an "undesirable organisation".

Branches 
The UNF has local branches in Ottawa, Montreal, Oshawa, Toronto(2), St. Catharines, Hamilton, Windsor, Sudbury, Winnipeg, Saskatoon, Regina and Edmonton.

See also 

 List of Ukrainian Canadians
 List of Canadian place names of Ukrainian origin

References 

Canada
Organizations based in Toronto
Diaspora organizations in Canada
Undesirable organizations in Russia